Mike Day (born 31 July 1955 in Auckland) is a New Zealand professional darts player who currently plays in World Darts Federation events. He reached the first round of the 2014 BDO World Darts Championship.

Career
In 2013 he won the Canterbury Open, he beat Tony Carmichael in the final 5–4. He qualified for the 2014 BDO World Darts Championship, he played Sam Head in the preliminary round winning 3–0 before losing to Glen Durrant in the first round 3–0.  He qualified for the 2015 BDO World Darts Championship, he played Jeff Smith in the preliminary round losing 3–0.

World Championship results

BDO
 2014: First Round (lost to Glen Durrant 0–3) (sets) 
 2015: Preliminary round (lost to Jeff Smith 0–3)

External links
Mike Day's profile and stats on Darts Database

References

People from Auckland 
1955 births
Living people
New Zealand darts players
British Darts Organisation players